This War Is Ours is the second album by American rock band Escape the Fate. It is the first Escape the Fate album to feature former Blessthefall singer Craig Mabbitt on vocals. The album received mixed reviews from critics. It was produced by John Feldmann, and released on October 21, 2008 through Epitaph Records.

The album debuted at No. 35 on the Billboard 200, selling 13,000 copies in the first week of its release.

Promotion
Starting on September 2, 2008, fans of Escape the Fate went to a special page on Buzznet to help unlock "the first track" off of This War Is Ours. Once the page had 50,000 viewers at the same time, the new song was then released to play and download for free. In order for a user's "page view" to be considered a contribution to the counter, the page had to remain open and active. Other sites could be used through different tabs or new windows, as long as the Buzznet page stayed open. Because this was a difficult task, fans were asked to "tell everyone [they] know to come to [the] page" in an attempt to reach 50,000 views as fast as possible. About 30 hours after the project started, the new song titled "The Flood" was unlocked and was also available for free download to anyone (whether they participated or not).

On October 1, 2008, the band released "This War Is Ours (The Guillotine II)" for download. This song is a sequel to "The Guillotine" from the band's previous studio album, Dying Is Your Latest Fashion, with Ronnie Radke on vocals. It served as the album's fourth single, with a music video shot in Santa Ana, California on January 9, 2010 and released alongside the album's deluxe edition on April 27th.

The official video for "Something" was released to MTV on January 12, 2009.

The video for the album's third single "10 Miles Wide" was released June 9, 2009.

Deluxe special edition
In an interview with Max and Craig, they stated that they would re-release This War Is Ours with a bonus disc with many different features not seen before.

The CD includes two new songs, "Bad Blood" and "Behind the Mask", an acoustic version of "Harder Than You Know", and a remix called "This War Is Mine" by Shawn Crahan of Slipknot. It also comes with a DVD that features the music videos to "The Flood", "Something", "10 Miles Wide", and "This War Is Ours (The Guillotine II)". It also comes with a world tour documentary and a behind the music feature. The deluxe edition was released on April 27, 2010.

There is a typo in the insert booklet for "This War Is Ours (The Guillotine II)". The lyrics, albeit correct, for "10 Miles Wide" are listed.

For the "10 Miles Wide" video on the DVD, any time a curse word is said that word is censored. However, the official video for "10 Miles Wide" on Epitaph Records' YouTube channel is not censored. Behind the Music and the European Tour (featured on the DVD) also do not censor curse words.

Track listing
All songs written by Escape the Fate and John Feldmann except where noted.

Personnel
This War Is Ours album personnel as listed on Allmusic.

Escape the Fate
 Craig Mabbitt – lead vocals
 Monte Money – guitars, keyboards, backing vocals
 Max Green – bass, co-lead vocals
 Robert Ortiz – drums

Production
 John Feldmann – production, engineer, mixing
 Brett Allen – credits director
 Matt Appleton – engineer
 Casey Howard – art direction, illustrations
 Kyle Moorman – engineer
 David Neely – credits director
 John Nicholson – drum technician
 Joey Simmrin – management
 Adam Topol – credits director

Additional musicians
 Josh Todd – co-lead vocals on "10 Miles Wide", backing vocals on "Harder Than You Know", composer
 Shawn "Clown" Crahan – remixer on "This War Is Ours"
 Matt Appleton – keyboards, synthesizers, horn, ukulele, charango, vocals
 John Feldmann – keyboards, percussion, programming, composer, vocals
 Kyle Moorman – kalimba, vocals
 Jess Neilson – flute
 Julian Feldmann – vocals
 Benji Madden – vocals

Chart positions

Release history

CD

Deluxe special edition

References

2008 albums
Escape the Fate albums
Epitaph Records albums
Albums produced by John Feldmann